Meredith Grey, M.D., F.A.C.S. is a fictional and titular character from the medical drama television series Grey's Anatomy, which airs on the American Broadcasting Company (ABC) in the United States. The character was created by series producer Shonda Rhimes, and is portrayed by actress Ellen Pompeo. She made her first appearance in the pilot episode, "A Hard Day's Night", which was broadcast on March 27, 2005. She made her last appearance (as a series regular) in the seventh episode of season 19, "I'll Follow the Sun" which was broadcast on February 23, 2023. She will continue to do the voiceover at the beginning and end of each episode. Meredith appears in the spin-off series Station 19 as a recurring character.

Meredith is the series' protagonist, and was introduced as a surgical intern at the fictional Seattle Grace Hospital (later Seattle Grace-Mercy West Hospital, and afterwards Grey+Sloan Memorial), eventually obtaining the position of a surgical resident, and later the position of an attending, and in 2016, attaining the Chief of General Surgery position. As the daughter of world-renowned surgeon Ellis Grey, Meredith struggles with the everyday life of being in a competitive profession, maintaining the relationship with her one-night stand and eventual husband, Derek Shepherd (McDreamy), her motherhood, and her friendships with her colleagues.

Meredith is the narrator of the show and serves as the focal point for most episodes, although the audience receives perspectives from other characters as well. Pompeo's connection with Patrick Dempsey (Derek Shepherd) is acclaimed as a high point of the series. Rhimes has characterized Meredith as not believing in good or bad, but instead doing what she thinks is right. Grey has been positively received by television critics, with Alessandra Stanley of The New York Times referring to her as "the heroine of Grey's Anatomy".

Pompeo's performance has been well received throughout the show and the character has gained widespread popularity worldwide. Pompeo has been nominated for multiple awards for her portrayal of the character in the long running ABC medical drama including Satellite Award for Best Actress and multiple nominations at the People's Choice Awards for Best Actress winning at 39th People's Choice Awards in 2013 and again in 2015 at 41st People's Choice Awards, Pompeo has also received a Best Performance by an Actress in a Drama Series nomination at the 64th Golden Globe Awards.

Storylines and characteristics 
Meredith Grey is the daughter of world-renowned Attending general surgeon, Ellis Grey, and grew up in her shadow. Ellis was a deeply flawed, emotionally unavailable, verbally abusive, and neglectful mother. Meredith is described as a "dark and twisty," damaged woman who sees the world in varying shades of grey. Because of this, she is an emotionally complex person. She is capable of empathizing with others when they're at their lowest points and is a sensitive observer of the people around her. Meredith is a graduate of Dartmouth College. While in college, conflicts with her mother lead Meredith to question her decision to attend medical school. That indecision leads her to make plans to sleep and party her way through Europe once she graduates. However, after a month abroad, Meredith is called back to care for her mother, who has developed early-onset Alzheimer's disease. This news drives Meredith's decision to obtain her M.D.

The night before Meredith's internship begins, she has a one-night stand with Derek Shepherd (Patrick Dempsey), a man she meets at Joe's Bar. She discovers the next day that he is a recently hired attending; the new head of neurosurgery at her new workplace, Seattle Grace Hospital. Meredith is assigned to work under resident Miranda Bailey (Chandra Wilson), and befriends her fellow interns, Cristina Yang (Sandra Oh), Izzie Stevens (Katherine Heigl), Alex Karev (Justin Chambers) and George O'Malley (T.R. Knight). She is particularly close with Cristina Yang, who becomes her best friend and "person". Though she initially thinks poorly of him, Alex Karev also evolves into Meredith's "person" and the two assume a sibling-esque familial relationship. Meredith has a conflicted relationship with Richard Webber (James Pickens Jr.), the Chief of Surgery at Seattle Grace. Richard was very close to Ellis and even had an affair when Meredith was a child. Due to his relationship with Meredith's mother, he tends to save, mentor and make exceptions for her. Meredith has a habit of "collecting strays", and allows her friends and coworkers to live in the house her mother left her. Those friends become her pseudo-family. Meredith is endlessly loyal to those she deems her family, and will bend the traditional rules of morality or professional protocol to keep them safe.

Having grown up in a hospital, Meredith shows immense natural talent. She possesses a steadfast, calm ease during medical procedures and emergencies, and is a natural observer of people. She exhibits a knack for catching subtle hints and accurately determining difficult-to-catch diagnoses. Her placid, non-judgmental bedside manner often causes people to open up and trust her. Her surgical skills are solidly impressive and she shows a talent and patience for medical research trials and dealing with psychologically damaged patients.

Meredith resists Derek's advances throughout her internship, but is eventually charmed into starting a relationship with him despite misgivings about an intern dating an attending. She is, therefore, shocked by the arrival of Addison Montgomery (Kate Walsh), Derek's wife, unaware that he was married. Derek struggles to choose between the two, but ultimately returns to Addison, despite Meredith begging to be chosen instead. Meredith is devastated and turns to multiple, self-destructive means of coping. Initially she falls on old habits of self-medicating with tequila and sex, and adopts a dog, named Doc. She also tries to resolve some issues by searching for her long-absent father, Thatcher. She learns that her father, who left when she was five and she has not seen since, remarried and had two more daughters. The two do not become close, but Grey becomes fond of her stepmother. Meredith spirals further when Ellis is admitted to the hospital, revealing Ellis' diagnosis of early-onset Alzheimer's and her verbally abusive tendencies. Meredith's self-destructive behavior reaches its most dangerous when she saves a patient with a bomb in their chest by impulsively inserting her hand to hold it until the bomb squad can remove it.

Meredith has a series of one-night stands, including one with George, who has long been in love with her. When she cries in the middle of their encounter, their friendship temporarily ends. Meredith swears off her behavior, agrees to be friends only with Derek, and embarks on a relationship with veterinarian Finn Dandridge (Chris O'Donnell). Derek regrets his decision to return to his wife, and Meredith must decide whether to continue a relationship with Finn, or allow Derek a second chance. She eventually realizes that Derek is the one, and the two get back together.

When Ellis experiences a rare, completely lucid day and expresses her immense disappointment at how ordinary Meredith has turned out to be, Meredith becomes depressed and possibly suicidal. During a ferryboat accident, Meredith is knocked into the water and chooses to give up and drown, rather than fight and swim. She flatlines at the hospital, and awakens in an "afterlife", where she interacts with deceased former acquaintances. Ellis dies in the interim, and Meredith meets with her mother, who tells her that she is anything but ordinary. She undergoes another round of resuscitation at the insistence of Cristina. Derek distances himself from Meredith as the result of her self-recklessness, prompting her to seek therapy to address her problems. Meredith sees a therapist, Dr. Wyatt (Amy Madigan), to seek happiness and begins to successfully tackle her issues. Meanwhile, Meredith nearly fails her intern exam after a drunken Thatcher publicly blames Meredith for the death of his wife, Susan, a distraught Grey sits through her entire test without writing a single answer. Webber gives her a second chance to do the exam, saving her from destroying her career.

After Meredith is promoted to a resident, her younger half-sister, Lexie Grey (Chyler Leigh), begins working at Seattle Grace as an intern. Meredith initially rejects Lexie's attempts to form a relationship, but slowly softens towards her. The sisters are very different people with different childhoods. Lexie had a more idealistic family life and often has difficulty understanding her much darker sister, who does not have the same positive associations with family as Lexie.

Meredith later initiates a neurosurgical clinical trial, enlisting Derek as a consulting neurosurgeon. The trial fails repeatedly, but the final patient they treat survives, prompting them to reunite and move in together. Their relationship is healthier than before but still experiences snags as the two attempt to understand each other and navigate through what they now look at as a permanent, long-term relationship. Meredith relies heavily on Cristina for emotional support and guidance. Eventually, Derek and Meredith decide to marry, but on their wedding day, the pair give their "perfect" wedding ceremony to Izzie and Alex, to marry each other during the planned ceremony instead. Meredith and Derek instead marry by writing their wedding vows on a post-it note. Meredith then spends a month out of commission after donating part of her liver to Thatcher.

Meredith experiences another immense trauma after the hospital is put under a lockdown from an active mass-shooter seeking revenge against Derek. Meredith offers her own life in exchange for his and miscarries her baby during the crisis. She goes through this traumatic experience with Cristina, who operates on Derek while threatened at gunpoint. Meredith hides her loss and the trauma psychiatrist refuses to clear neither Cristina nor Meredith for their return to surgery. Meredith is able to work through her issues and become cleared, but Cristina remains deeply traumatized. Meredith covers for and supports her friend through her dark time but is ultimately unable to fully help her return to surgery.

Meredith decides to actively try to become pregnant but learns that she has a "hostile uterus", which leads her to consider her other possible genetic flaws. Derek, who is constantly worried about the possibility that she will develop Alzheimer's, initiates a clinical trial hoping to cure the disease. Meredith opts to work on the trial and appears to be leaning towards a neuro specialty.

When Webber's wife, Adele, is diagnosed with Alzheimer's, she receives a spot on the trial. Meredith tampers with the drugs so that Adele does not receive the placebo. She and Derek decide to adopt Zola, an orphaned baby from Malawi, and make their marriage legal. When the truth about the tampering comes out, however, a furious Derek tells her he cannot raise a child with her because of her moral ambiguity. Meredith is fired and tries to conceal both this and her marital separation from the adoption counselor in order to keep Zola. Although Dr. Webber steps down as chief of surgery and takes the blame for the trial tampering to protect Meredith, Zola is taken away. She and Derek reconcile. Meredith chooses a general surgery specialty over neuro, and they successfully fight to get Zola back.

As her last year of residency is coming to a close, the residents travel around the country, searching for the best jobs in their specialties. In order to finish their residency, the residents must take the medical boards. Meredith takes the exam while sick with the flu. She decides to take a job offer at The Brigham and Women's Hospital as the next step in her career. During a medical flight to undertake a prestigious surgery involving conjoined twins, Meredith, Derek, Cristina, and Lexie, among others, are involved in an aviation accident. The plane crash kills Lexie and her boyfriend Mark Sloan(Eric Dane), and the survivors are trapped in the wooded wilderness for days waiting for help. Following their rescue, Meredith becomes an attending general surgeon at Seattle Grace, now Seattle Grace-Mercy West. While Cristina flees Seattle for her fellowship, Meredith, afraid of flying and change, declines her job offer, and clings to what remains in Seattle. Cristina and Meredith begin calling the hospital “Seattle Grace Mercy Death” in light of the immense amount of trauma, death, and pain they have experienced there.

Meredith's newfound attitude and sarcasm leads to her being dubbed "Medusa" by the hospital's new batch of interns. In the aftermath of the plane accident, the hospital is sued and eventually found guilty of negligence. Each victim including Derek, Cristina, Arizona Robbins (Jessica Capshaw) and herself must receive $15 million of compensation, which leads the hospital to a near bankruptcy as the insurance company refuses to pay due to a loophole. The doctors along with Callie Torres (Sara Ramirez) buy the hospital with the help of the Harper Avery Foundation to prevent it from closing and become new members of the directing board. In memory of Mark Sloan and Lexie Grey, Jackson Avery and the board rename the hospital “Grey Sloan Memorial Hospital.” Meanwhile, Meredith asks Dr. Bailey to perform gene mapping on her to finally know whether she has Alzheimer's genes like her mother. She tests positive for more than one of the genetic markers for the disease.

Meredith moves to the completed dream home and sells her house to Alex, who purchases it as the only true home he's ever known. He continues Meredith's tradition of keeping the house open to any "strays" needing a home. Meredith discovers also she is pregnant with Derek’s child once again; however the pregnancy carries on. When Meredith’s water breaks (not long before she suffers a near miscarriage by falling down the stairs), the baby has face presentation and is consequently delivered via emergency C-section. While stitching Meredith up, the obstetrician who operated on her is called away to another patient and intern Shane Ross completes the stitching. When blood begins to appear from everywhere due to her fall, Meredith diagnoses herself in as being in disseminated intravascular coagulation. Dr. Bailey performs a spleen removal, which saves her life. In return, Derek and Meredith name their son Bailey.

As a spouse, surgeon, and mother, Meredith has cited a number times that she did not want to be like either of her parents: her father had followed her mother around pathetically before leaving to be happy, while her mother valued her career over her family. Meredith is frequently conflicted trying to balance between the two, and fears her family are hindering her medical aspirations, as much as she fears becoming like her mother whenever she's tempted to choose surgery over family. Meredith and Cristina have a huge rift when Cristina confirms Meredith's fears by stating that Meredith's skills have fallen behind Cristina's due to her familial obligations taking her away from O.R time.

Meredith and Derek come to an agreement that he, already established in his career and reputation, would take a step back to take care of the children and allow her to shine. Meredith attempts to regain some ground by starting a promising research trial 3-D printing portal veins. The conflict between Cristina and Meredith widens when Cristina commandeers Meredith's resources for her own trial, ultimately garnering a Harper Avery nomination for Cristina. Cristina and Meredith repair their relationship when Meredith confesses that Cristina was correct, her skills have surpassed Meredith's. Cristina moves to Switzerland, taking  up a job offer from Preston Burke (Isaiah Washington), her former attending, mentor and fiancé, who was looking for a replacement at a research hospital he was running, thus leaving Alex in charge of being Meredith's "person" in her place, an honor he gladly accepts.

As Meredith adjusts to life without Cristina, she finds out she has a maternal half-sister named Maggie Pierce (Kelly McCreary), who was given away for adoption by her mother right after she gave birth and who is now working in Grey Sloan Memorial as the new Chief of Cardiothoracic Surgery. Meredith is in denial and rejects Maggie, thinking she would have remembered if her mother was pregnant. Meredith tries to piece together her relationship with her mother and half-sister by going through old videos of her mother. She eventually recovers her repressed memories of the pregnancy when she views her mother's diary. With the support of Webber, who is Maggie's biological father, Meredith has a change of heart, choosing to accept Maggie and begin building a relationship.

Meanwhile, Meredith and Derek's marriage becomes strained as Derek accepts an offer from the U.S. president to participate in the Brain Mapping Initiative. He receives an offer to head the project itself in Washington D.C., meaning that he would have to be based there permanently. Meredith puts her foot down as she does not want to uproot their young family to move across the country for his career at the sacrifice of her own. They begin a series of on-and-off arguments and "cold wars" over their careers. Meredith ultimately encourages Derek to go to Washington, and Derek promptly leaves. Meredith then proceeds to lean on her friends for support as she begins living life as a single parent while simultaneously maintaining a streak of successful surgeries with no patient-losses. During a phone call with Derek, Meredith and Derek agree to work things out after she tells him that she did not want them to become "one of those couples", and he reciprocates, saying that he missed her. She privately admits to Alex that she has realized that she could live independently of Derek but chooses not to.

Just as Meredith and Derek begin to rekindle their relationship, Derek is suddenly killed in a car accident while en route to the airport to catch a flight for one final meeting in D.C. He was taken to an understaffed hospital, which reluctantly took him in despite not being a trauma center. The doctors failed to recognize his head injury in time. Derek is declared brain dead, and Meredith must go to the medical center to consent to remove him from life support. She tells Penny, the intern who was assigned to Derek, that every doctor has "that one" patient who dies on their watch and haunts them forever and "that one will make you work harder, and they make you better."

After Derek's death, Meredith returns to Grey Sloan Memorial to inform the others of his passing. Following the funeral service, Meredith impulsively packs up her belongings and leaves with the children to an undisclosed location. Months pass by while her friends and family are unaware of her whereabouts. Eventually, parallels show similarities in Meredith's and Ellis' lives: both have lost the love of their life, both run away from Seattle following their loss, and both eventually give birth to a daughter. Meredith names her newborn daughter Ellis after her mother. Having listed Alex as her emergency contact, he meets her at the hospital after delivering baby Ellis. With the support of Alex, Meredith returns to Seattle with the children and is later appointed Chief of General Surgery by Bailey. She sells the "dream house" and moves back to her mother's house, having purchased it back from Alex, and now lives there with Maggie and Amelia Shepherd, her sister-in-law. The three are pushed to learn how to more effectively communicate, support one another, and functionally live as sisters.

Having settled back into life in Seattle, Meredith hosts a dinner party and at the party, Callie brings her new girlfriend, who is revealed to be Penny, the intern who worked on Derek at the hospital the night he died. Later at the event, Meredith finds out Penny will be joining her at Grey Sloan Memorial. Meredith is forced to work with Penny, and over time, decides to effectively train her to be a better surgeon. Meredith eventually forgives Penny, who becomes her favorite resident. Alex and Meredith continue their close, sibling-like relationship of being each other's "person", despite Jo's displeasure and inability to understand their closeness. He supports her when she is violently attacked by a disoriented patient, and she supports him through his legal difficulties. Alex initiates a weekly family waffle breakfast on Sundays, where he makes waffles for everyone in the house.

Meredith recovers enough to start seeing Nathan Riggs (Martin Henderson), Owen Hunt's former best friend, although their relationship is complicated by the fact that Maggie confesses to Meredith that she has feelings for Riggs. Additionally, Meredith is not ready to declare their relationship formally or publicly. Eventually, she accepts her relationship with Riggs, but it's complicated again by the unexpected return of Owen's sister, Megan Hunt, Riggs' fiancée. Meredith finds herself in another love triangle when Megan rejects Riggs because he is still in love with Meredith, but Meredith pushes them to be together.

After her relationship with Riggs ends, Meredith is nominated for a Harper Avery Award for her groundbreaking abdominal transplant surgery on Megan. After failing to attend the awards ceremony to stay for a medical trauma, post-surgery, Meredith learns with all her closest friends in the OR and gallery that she has won the Harper Avery Award. After her win, Meredith throws herself into her work and is chosen to continue her project by the hospital's research contest. However, when she has difficulty getting access to a patented polymer from Europe, she is dragged back into her mother's past, as it is Ellis' former best friend, Marie, who is unwilling to help Meredith out. Eventually, Meredith discovers the full truth about Marie and Ellis' falling out and is able to repair some of the damage.

During Jo and Alex's wedding, Meredith is kissed by a drunken Andrew DeLuca (Giacomo Gianniotti), and the two brush it off. However, while Meredith starts dating again with the help of her matchmaker patient, CeCe, she is pursued by Andrew, who has realized his feelings for her. Meredith also gets interest from Atticus Lincoln (Chris Carmack), a new orthopedic surgeon, and briefly finds herself in a love triangle. During her romantic dilemma, her estranged father, Thatcher, passes away, though they are able to make peace before his death. Eventually, Meredith chooses Andrew, and the two begin a relationship. Meredith breaks the hospital record for the longest single surgery and then begins research on an ingestible diagnostic device.

While treating Gabby Rivera, a young girl with cancer whose family has been split up at the border, Meredith commits insurance fraud to help Gabby's father pay for the surgery. When the hospital starts investigating the case, Andrew takes the fall so that Meredith won't be sent to prison and separated from her kids. Meredith visits Andrew in jail, telling him that she loves him and will get him out. Meredith turns herself in and is sentenced to community service, while her medical license, though not revoked, is put in jeopardy. She misses a court date and neglects to perform some of the hours, leading to a temporary stay in jail. After a hearing is conducted, Meredith is able to keep her license and is rehired at Grey-Sloan.

On Meredith's first day back, she meets Cormac Hayes (Richard Flood), the new Chief of Pediatrics, who she later learns has been sent to her by Cristina. Hayes and Meredith grow closer and bond over their shared loss of a spouse. Andrew begins showing signs of mania, possibly brought on by bipolar disorder, and breaks up with Meredith when she expresses concern. Shortly after her breakup with Andrew, Meredith learns that Alex has moved to Kansas to be with Izzie and will not be returning to Seattle.

During the COVID-19 pandemic, Meredith is stressed while coping the high rate of deaths. Meredith ultimately contracts COVID-19, and while she fights for her life, she goes in and out of consciousness. During her fever dreams, which take place on a beach, she encounters several loved ones in the afterlife, including Derek, George, Andrew, Mark, and Lexie. Though she is in and out of consciousness, she can hear people talk to her in the real world. Meredith eventually recovers and gets strong enough to begin operating again. At the same time, she also takes over Richard's position as Residency Program Director.

Following the COVID-19 pandemic, Meredith has fully recovered. She then meets Dr. David Hamilton (Peter Gallagher), a neurosurgeon who is also an old friend of her mother's. He offers her the opportunity to help find a cure to Parkinson's disease. Despite some uncertainty, she agrees to his offer on the condition that she can do it both in Seattle and Minnesota, where the trial is located. It is also revealed that she and Hayes briefly dated but decided to hold off on their relationship when his eldest son started having panic attacks because of their relationship. During her time in Minnesota, Meredith runs into her former patient, a transplant surgeon named Dr. Nick Marsh (Scott Speedman). They both bond over being miracles and start dating. Meredith begins splitting her time between Minnesota and Seattle, putting a strain on her relationship with Bailey that worsens when Dr. Hamilton offers Meredith a full-time position at the Mayo Clinic that Meredith seriously considers. At the end of Season 18, Meredith prepares herself and the kids for a move to Minnesota, but her plans are halted when Bailey resigns following the collapse of Grey Sloan's residency program. Bailey appoints Meredith as the new Chief of Surgery, and in the chaos of all the change, Meredith tells Nick to go back to Minnesota without her and breaks up with him.

Development

Casting and creation 

Pompeo discovered Grey's Anatomy after an extended period of doing nothing in the acting profession. Her agent suggested she audition amongst other projects. While casting actresses for the part of Meredith Grey, series' creator Shonda Rhimes said: "I kept saying we need a girl like that girl from Moonlight Mile, and after a while, they were like, 'We think we can get that girl from Moonlight Mile.' I spent time with her and got to know her, and then we started casting for the men." She reported that Grey was not an easy role to cast because of the strong verbal possibilities. Rhimes was informed that the actress in question was Pompeo, who had a deal in place with ABC, having previously tested for a pilot on the network. It has been speculated that Pompeo was the first character to be cast, but when asked, she said she did not know of this. When asked of how she created Pompeo's character, Rhimes said:

Pompeo was cast as the program's titular character, described by Mary McNamara of the Los Angeles Times as "a prickly, independent sort whose ambition, and ambivalence, is fueled by the fact that her mother was a gifted surgeon and now suffers from Alzheimer's." Grey also serves as the show's narrator, and as such was likened in early reviews to Carrie Bradshaw (Sarah Jessica Parker), the narrator and protagonist of Sex and the City. After her initial contract with Grey's Anatomy expired, Pompeo negotiated a new one, in which she would be paid US$200,000 per episode, making her and Dempsey the highest-paid cast members on the show. In 2012, Forbes recognized Pompeo as the eighth highest-paid actress on television, with a salary of US$275,000 per episode for her role on Grey's Anatomy.

Pompeo's second contract with Grey's Anatomy expired after the eighth season, and speculation arose that she would be leaving subsequently. In September 2011, Pompeo reported that she is open to the idea of extending her contract if invited. She told TV Guide: "I would never turn up my nose at [Grey's Anatomy]. As long as the stories are honest and truthful, and Patrick [Dempsey] and I feel there is material for us to be passionate about, it still beats a 9-to-5 job any day. If I hear from the fans that they want us to keep going, then I would continue because we owe them everything." E! Online reported in May 2012, that Pompeo, as well as all original cast members, have signed on for two more years. With the Huffington Post announcement of season nine having officially been renewed, the contract is set into place for Pompeo to return.

Pompeo's contract expired again at the end of the twelfth season. She signed a new contract to keep her in the starring role on the series for the thirteenth season. According to a report in Deadline Hollywood, Pompeo was earning $300,000 per episode under the new deal.

On January 17, 2018, it was announced by ABC that Ellen Pompeo's contract had been renewed through season 16. Not only does the contract renewal secure Pompeo's return as Meredith Grey, but it also makes her a producer of Grey's Anatomy and a co-executive producer of the spin-off series. The deal will make Pompeo the highest-paid actress currently on a dramatic TV series, with her making $575,000 per episode and over $20 million yearly. On May 10, 2019, Pompeo extended her contract through the seventeenth season after ABC renewed the show for seasons 16 and 17.

Characterization 

Grey is the protagonist and focal point of the series. She has been called "intelligent, compassionate, hard-working, oftentimes outspoken, easily distracted, and indecisive" by Grey's Anatomy executives. Pompeo says she is unaware if her character knows how to have fun, adding: "All of my scenes with [Dempsey] are the same—we're either breaking up or having sex." Her personality has evolved over the past few seasons from depressed, to happy and "fixed". Pompeo said to Good Morning America, "I am so incredibly lucky to have Patrick [Dempsey], to have the chemistry that we do, we have an amazing relationship, and it's like any other relationship, you have your ups and downs. But we work it out, and we've found a way to do this for this long and still get along, and make it work and believe in what we're doing." Pompeo told Entertainment Weekly: "It's awkward with Patrick [Dempsey] because he's like my brother. As soon as the camera is off, I'm like, 'Is your hand on my butt?' But there are millions of girls who have been waiting for this, so I feel an obligation to the fans." Rhimes used the dog "Doc", which Meredith and Derek shared, as a metaphor for their relationship during the second season. She characterizes Grey as doing what she thinks is right:

The character had a one-night stand with George O'Malley, in the second season. Series writer Stacy McKee, said of the sexual encounter: "There's no turning back. There's nothing George and Meredith can do. The damage is done – things will never be the same. They've just changed something important in their lives FOREVER and...they are freaking out." Grey's character development has also been known as an influence on the creation of her half-sister, Lexie Grey. Particularly, it has been made clear that they both share the same motives. McKee offered her thoughts: "Meredith and Lexie both want to succeed. They want to be strong. They want to feel normal. They want, so much, to be whole. But it's a struggle – a genuine struggle for them. Being hardcore doesn't come naturally. Sometimes, they have to fake it." Grey's personality has been compared with that of Alex Karev's. Rhimes offered the insight:

Pompeo fights for a truthful storyline for her character—she wants it to be realistic and says you can't always wrap it up in a neat little package. Referring to Grey's tampering with Shepherd's trial, Pompeo said: "Listen, what Meredith did clearly crossed a line. Derek has a right to be pissed." Following the tampering, Rhimes said she believes that Grey and Shepherd are meant to be together and that it in the end, they will end up with each other. Grey's relationship with Cristina Yang, has been looked upon as "sisterhood", and Yang has repeatedly referred to Grey as "her person". This led to the two being dubbed "the twisted sisters". At the conclusion of season three, the duo went on a "honeymoon" together, and Rhimes called it her favorite detail of the finale. Grey has been characterized, by some, as "whiny". Rhimes offered her insight:

Rhimes felt that the 100th episode showed well Meredith's evolution throughout the show from a "dark and twisty girl" to a "happy woman". She said: "She is the thing her mother wished for her. She is extraordinary. Because, to get past the crap of your past? To move on? To let the past go and change? That is extraordinary. To love? Without fear? Without screwing it up? That is extraordinary. It makes me happy to see her happy."

Following the departure of Patrick Dempsey's character, Rhimes was quoted as saying that "... Meredith and the entire Grey's Anatomy family are about to enter uncharted territory as we head into this new chapter of her life. The possibilities for what may come are endless." With at least a year left in Pompeo's contract with the show, viewers are sure to witness some of the most difficult times of Meredith's life yet.

Reception

Reviews

The character has received both overwhelmingly positive reviews and weary response from television critics throughout the course of the show. The initial response to the character was positive, but as the series progressed Meredith Grey became immensely popular and Pompeo established the character as a critic and fan favorite featuring on a number of Top TV Character lists. The development of the character has been deemed as the highlight of the show. Grey has constantly been defined as "the heroine of Grey's Anatomy". At the time of inception Newsdays Diane Werts praised the character stating: "Like Hugh Laurie's irascible "House" title character, star Ellen Pompeo's newly minted Dr. Grey conveys such substance that you simply can't stop watching." Ellen A. Kim of After Pompeo not receiving an Emmy nomination for her work as Grey, McNamara of the Los Angeles Times suggested that Pompeo, "who has worked very hard and against all narrative odds to make Meredith Grey an interesting character at last" should have received a nomination at the 61st Primetime Emmy Awards. Later, during the twelfth season, Western Gazette  gave Ellen Pompeo the credit for carrying the show and re-iterated it's "time for Pompeo to finally win an Emmy Award." Tanner Stransky of Entertainment Weekly referred to Grey as the "trusty voice-over master" of Grey's Anatomy.

Former television columnist for The Star-Ledger Alan Sepinwall expressed his boredom on the focus given on Grey's relationships storylines while reviewing the second season's finale: "On those occasions when Meredith's not involved in a plot about her love life, I do kind of like her, but those moments are so infrequent compared to her constant angsting over McDreamy -- not to mention all those seemingly unrelated storylines that always turn into a metaphor for that relationship -- that I really, really can't stand her." During the show's third season, the development of the character received negative reviews, with Cristopher Monfette of IGN stating that her storyline has become "some bizarrely under-developed sub-plot about depression and giving Derek a season's worth of reconsidering to do." Also during the third season, Robert Rorke of the New York Post noted the decline in Meredith's role in the show, expressing disappointment: "She used to be the queen of the romantic dilemmas, but lately, she's been a little dopey, what with the endless McDreamy soliloquies." Similarly, Macleans.ca found their storyline in the fourth season overused, "This whole 'Oh I need more time,' but 'Oh, I'm jealous if you look at someone else' angst was tired in the second season, frustrating in the third and now a total channel changer. The will-they-or-won't-they plot doesn't work because they've already been in and out of that relationship too many times. Meredith is a nag and McDreamy is henpecked." On a more positive note, her relationship with Shepherd was included in AOL TV's list of the "Best TV Couples of All Time" and in the same list by TV Guide.

During the sixth season the development of the character was praised, Glenn Diaz of BuddyTV commented that "You gotta love Mer when she's gloomy.", in addition to praising Pompeo's performance. In her review of the episode Tainted Obligation she wrote "I felt for Meredith, but after Lexie's heartfelt begging and pleading, I was happy that Mere finally grows up and casts her selfishness aside. Three seasons ago Meredith would never have dreamed of putting Lexie first, and I was proud of her for giving up part of her liver—her offer to get to know her dad was an even bigger milestone." Reviewing the first part of the eighth season, TV Fanatic lauded the character and wrote: "this season belongs to Meredith Grey. She is the heart and soul of the show and has been outstanding. This is a character that used to be so dark and twisty and has now grown into a more mature woman. Ellen Pompeo has been at the top of her game this season."

Wit & Fancy praised the transformation of the character and stated, "Of course Meredith will still make rash decisions like when she took off with Zola or tampered with the trial, but she does things out of love and the kindness of her heart now and not because she is dark and twisty. Considering where Meredith was at the beginning and where she is now, I think she went through a remarkable journey and did more than just growing up, she finally became 'all whole and healed'."

Maura O'Malley of Bustle also lauded the development of the character ahead of season 12 saying, "When the series began, Meredith was just a girl sitting in a bar celebrating the exciting next phase of her life. She had graduated medical school, she was starting her residency at a prestigious hospital, and she was simply looking for a no-strings attached, one night stand. What she got instead was a complicated romantic relationship that rivals Romeo and Juliet — but the key is, she wasn't searching for love. Working and learning were — and continue to be — her priorities, while McDreamy was simply an added perk. Hopefully, the new season of Grey's Anatomy will reflect this change in tone, because Meredith is a strong, independent woman — and she will be just fine."

Later in the series, Ellen Pompeo received critical acclaim with numerous critics lauding her portrayal of the character. Reviewing the episode She's Leaving Home CarterMatt called her the "anchor" for Grey's saying, "Throughout, this was an episode completely anchored by Ellen Pompeo, who has done some of her best work ever on the show the past couple of weeks. Tonight, she cried, she fought, and she learned that she was carrying his child." and added that Pompeo is often "overlooked" saying, "Her subtlety is probably why she is often overlooked." Rick Porter of Zap2it reviewing "How to Save a Life" wrote, "Without Meredith, and without one of Pompeo's strongest performances in her long time on the show, "How to Save a Life" would have run the risk of coming across as a baldly manipulative death episode, the likes of which the show has done several times before. He added. "How to Save a Life" may not be the ideal Emmy-submission episode for Pompeo, considering Meredith is off screen for more than half of it. But it's among the best work she's ever done on the show." USA Today also lauded Pompeo saying, " In some ways, the episode (How to Save a Life) was even more of a showcase for Pompeo. She had some of the more memorable and well-played scenes, from her angry response to the doctor who tries to tell her what her choices are, to her resignation when she realizes she has to comfort and motivate the young doctor whose mistakes cost Derek his life."

The relation between Meredith and Cristina has been acclaimed and been a highlight of the show. Mark Perigard of the Boston Herald considered the friendship to be "the secret core of Grey's". Aisha Harris of Slate called their relation The Best Female Friendship on TV adding that "With those two characters, showrunner Shonda Rhimes and her team of writers created one of the most nuanced and realistic portrayals of female friendship on television." Samantha Highfill of Entertainment Weekly called Cristina and Meredith the best female friends on TV because "they don't try to be". There's nothing fake about them, which is a rarity in how female friends are portrayed on television.  She further went on to call them 'soulmates', " And even though they'd never dare get sappy enough to say it, they're soul mates.
Margaret Lyons of Vulture called the friendship " dream BFF relationship." and the primary focus of the show, "One of the series' calling cards has been its depiction of female friendship and particularly the primacy that friendship enjoyed over romantic relationships."

E! at the time of Sandra Oh's exit wrote, "In Grey's Anatomy 10-year history, the doctor duo has been through a lot together: weddings, deaths, plane crashes, bomb threats, shooting, you name it, they've lived (and danced) through it. " and added, "And with the three words, 'You're my person,' Cristina Yang and Meredith Grey solidified their status as the small screen's best best friends ever." Marama Whyte of Hypable wrote, "Critically, the key relationship in Meredith's life was not her romance with Derek Shepherd, but her passionate, indestructible, absolutely enviable friendship with Cristina. Talk about relationship goals; who wants McDreamy when Cristina Yang could be your person. These two were the real powerhouse, and Shonda Rhimes didn't shy away from making the audience remember this. Derek was the love of her life, but Cristina was her soul mate. More than anyone else, Cristina challenged Meredith, was honest with her and inspired her. For these reasons, it was Cristina who was constantly the source of Meredith's character development, not Derek."

Pompeo's character has also been used to define the image a strong woman, Bustle previewing the 12th season wrote, "Meredith Grey has always been capable of being on her own.  Grey's Anatomy is about Meredith's journey. Men and romantic interests are a part of her life, but they are not the priority. She doesn't need McDreamy. Grey's Anatomy doesn't need McDreamy. So even if the writers do decide to create a new love interest for Ms. Grey (Martin Henderson, perhaps?), it wouldn't matter. I have faith that the show's writers will do this storyline justice, because TV needs more strong single women — and Meredith seems like the perfect candidate." The site added, "This past season was almost a trial run for a McDreamy-less Grey's Anatomy. When Derek left for Washington D.C. to pursue his research, Meredith stayed behind and focused on her own career. She didn't chase him. Her priority were her children and the Grey Sloan Memorial Hospital. Meredith showed that she would never put aside her own dreams and aspirations for a man, and I believe that this won't change after Derek's death."

Awards

Pompeo has won and has been nominated for multiple awards for her portrayal of Grey. She and the Grey's Anatomy cast won Best Ensemble in a Television Series at the 2006 Satellite Awards. During the following year's ceremony, she was named Best Actress in a Television Drama Series. She was among the Grey's Anatomy cast members awarded the Outstanding Performance by an Ensemble in a Drama Series accolade at the 13th Screen Actors Guild Awards, and received nominations in the same category in 2006 and 2008. Pompeo received a Best Performance by an Actress in a Drama Series nomination at the 64th Golden Globe Awards – the program won Best Drama Series at the same ceremony. Also in 2007, Pompeo and the female cast and crew of Grey's Anatomy received the Women in Film Lucy Award, which honors those "whose work in television has positively influenced attitudes toward women."

Pompeo's performance has garnered her multiple People's Choice Awards. At the 37th People's Choice Awards, she was nominated against Dempsey and Oh in the Favorite TV Doctor category, and the following year, she was a contender in the Favorite TV Drama Actress category.

Since 2012, Pompeo has received a nomination at the People's Choice Awards every year in two categories at 40th People's Choice Awards alongside Patrick Dempsey and Sandra Oh respectively. She won the Best Drama Actress Award at both the 39th People's Choice Awards and the 41st People's Choice Awards.

In 2007, show-business awards reporter Tom O'Neil commented that Pompeo was overdue an Emmy Award nomination for her role in Grey's Anatomy. Readers of O'Neil's awards website, The Envelope, included Pompeo in their 2009 nominations for Best Drama Actress in the site's Gold Derby TV Awards. Entertainment Weekly launched the EWwy Awards in 2008, to honor actors who have not received Emmy nominations. Pompeo was nominated in the Best Actress in a Drama Series category, and placed fourth, with 19 percent of readers' votes.

 References SpecificGeneral'

External links 

 Meredith Grey at ABC.com

Grey's Anatomy characters
Fictional characters from Massachusetts
Fictional characters from Seattle
Fictional feminists and women's rights activists
Fictional storytellers
Television characters introduced in 2005
Fictional surgeons
Fictional female doctors
Crossover characters in television
American female characters in television